Mary John Mananzan  (born November 6, 1937, in Dagupan, Pangasinan) is a Missionary Benedictine nun, activist, educator, theologian, and author. She helped develop an Asian feminist theology of liberation. She currently ministers as superior of the Manila community and member of the Priory Council.

On March 8, 2011, she was cited as one of the 100 Most Inspiring Persons in the World, at the centennial of International Women's Day.

Background
She is co-convenor of the Movement Against Tyranny.  

She has served as president of Saint Scholastica's College for six years and dean for 18 years, prioress of the Missionary Benedictine Sisters in the Manila Priory, and national chairperson of the Association of Major Religious Superiors of the Philippines.

She also co-founded GABRIELA, federation of women's organizations and served as its national chairperson for 18 years.

Education 
Mananzan has a doctorate degree in Philosophy major in Linguistic Philosophy at the Pontifical Gregorian University in Rome, Italy. She also has a degree in Missiology at the Wilhelmsuniversitaet in Munster, Germany.

Mananzan studied at St. Scholastica's College in Manila from high school through college, graduating with an AB-BSE degree, major in history.

Controversial views

Mananzan is known for being feminist. She was one of the Catholics who supported the RH Bill, which guarantees access to contraception, fertility control, sexual education, and maternal care. The bill was signed by President Benigno Aquino III. 

She was also known for her support for SOGIE Equality Bill, known as Equality Bill or Anti-Discrimination Bill (ADB). 

Both bills were opposed by the Catholic Bishops' Conference of the Philippines.

Awards and recognition 

Mananzan has been recognized as follows:

 Benigno Aquino Jr. Award for Nationalism, Federation of Catholic Schools' Alumnae Association (2011)
 100 inspiring persons in the world, Women Deliver (2011, citation given on the occasion of the 100 years of the International Women's day celebration)
 Outstanding Woman Leader in Manila, Office of the Mayor of Manila (2009)
 Asian Public Intellectual fellowship, Nippon Foundation (2002)
 Henry Luce Fellowship at the Union Theological Seminary in New York (1995)
 Dorothy Cadbury Fellowship in Birmingham (1994)

See also 

 Religious sector resistance against the Marcos dictatorship
 La Tondeña strike 
 Movement Against Tyranny

References 

Filipino educators 
20th-century Filipino Roman Catholic nuns
1937 births
Living people
21st-century Filipino Roman Catholic nuns
Filipino writers 
Filipino feminists
Filipino Roman Catholic theologians